Main page: List of Canadian plants by family

Families:
A | B | C | D | E | F | G | H | I J K | L | M | N | O | P Q | R | S | T | U V W | X Y Z

Takakiaceae 

 Takakia lepidozioides

Taxaceae 

 Taxus brevifolia — Pacific yew
 Taxus canadensis — Canadian yew

Tetraphidaceae 

 Tetraphis geniculata
 Tetraphis pellucida
 Tetrodontium brownianum — little Georgia
 Tetrodontium repandum

Thamnobryaceae 

 Porotrichum bigelovii
 Porotrichum vancouveriense
 Thamnobryum alleghaniense — Alleghany thamnobryum moss
 Thamnobryum neckeroides

Theliaceae 

 Thelia asprella
 Thelia hirtella

Thelypteridaceae 

 Coryphopteris  simulata — bog fern
 Oreopteris quelpartensis — queen's-veil maidenfern
 Parathelypteris nevadensis — Sierra Nevada marsh fern
 Parathelypteris noveboracensis — New York fern
 Phegopteris connectilis — northern beech fern
 Phegopteris hexagonoptera — broad beech fern
 Thelypteris palustris — eastern marsh fern

Thuidiaceae 

 Abietinella abietina — abietinella moss
 Cyrto-hypnum minutulum
 Cyrto-hypnum pygmaeum
 Rauiella scita
 Thuidium delicatulum — delicate fern moss
 Thuidium philibertii
 Thuidium recognitum
 Thuidium tamariscinum

Thymelaeaceae 

 Dirca palustris — eastern leatherwood

Tiliaceae 

 Tilia americana — American basswood

Timmiaceae 

 Timmia austriaca
 Timmia megapolitana — warrior moss
 Timmia norvegica
 Timmia sibirica

Treubiaceae 

 Apotreubia nana

Trichocoleaceae 

 Trichocolea tomentella

Typhaceae 

 Typha angustifolia — narrowleaf cattail
 Typha latifolia — broadleaf cattail
 Typha x glauca — blue cattail

Canada,family,T